Patna Central Mall is a shopping mall in Patna, Bihar owned by  Anant Kumar Singh. It houses retail spaces, including a Central (Hypermarket), departmental store, multiplex, entertainment zone, food court, restaurants, gym, banquet halls, and shops.

The mall is located at Frazer Road, Patna. In November 2014, illegally constructed parts of the building were sealed by Patna district administration after the court ordered termination of all activities in the illegal parts.
However this mall is now permanently closed.

References

External links
 The Mall

Shopping malls in Patna
Shopping malls established in 2014
2014 establishments in Bihar